Naked City Theme is a live album by American jazz pianist Ahmad Jamal featuring performances recorded at the Jazz Workshop in 1964 and released on the Argo label.

Critical reception
AllMusic awarded the album 2 stars stating "Jamal's distinctive chord voicings and use of space and dynamics remained his trademark. Worth searching for".

Track listing
All compositions by Ahamad Jamal unless noted.
 "Naked City Theme" (Billy May, Milt Raskin) 5:09   
 "Minor Moods" – 7:21   
 "Haitian Market Place" (Richard Evans) – 7:09   
 "Beautiful Love" (Victor Young, Wayne King) – 3:40   
 "One For Miles" – 9:00   
 "Lollipops and Roses" (Tony Velona) – 7:12

Personnel
Ahmad Jamal – piano
Jamil Sulieman – bass
Chuck Lampkin – drums
Reice Hamel – Recording Engineer

References 

Argo Records live albums
Ahmad Jamal live albums
1964 live albums
albums recorded at the Jazz Workshop